Moment is the twelfth full-length studio album by Swedish melodic death metal band Dark Tranquillity, being released on 20 November 2020 via Century Media Records. The album is the band's first to include new guitarists Johan Reinholdz and Christopher Amott. This would be the final album with founding drummer Anders Jivarp and bassist Anders Iwers, who left the band in August 2021.

Reception
Moment received generally positive reviews from both fans and critics. Most feedback was very positive, while also stating that the album was not anything outstanding or out of the ordinary for the band. 

In a review from Sonic Perspective, Jonathan Smith said, "In the grand scheme of Dark Tranquillity’s near 30 year career, this stands as one of the more polished yet also one of the more safe ventures to come out of their arsenal. It doesn’t quite deliver the same level of lasting impact as Fiction, but it proves to be a slight step above most of what came between said album and the present."  Jason Roche of Blabbermouth said, "If you are a longtime DARK TRANQUILLITY fan, there is nothing on "Moment" that will particularly shock you. The new additions to the band slide into the picture in almost a plug-and-play manner, but here, that's a good thing as the final result is simply another strong record in an already impressively deep catalog." Tom Morgan of Distorted Sound said, "The masters have done it again, and their heart and soul proves an invigorating tonic to these days of anger and hatred."

Track listing

Personnel

Dark Tranquillity
Mikael Stanne – vocals
Christopher Amott – guitars
Johan Reinholdz - guitars
Anders Iwers – bass 
Martin Brändström – keyboards
Anders Jivarp – drums

Additional personnel
Jens Bogren – mixing, mastering
Niklas Sundin - artwork

Charts

References

2020 albums
Dark Tranquillity albums
Century Media Records albums